The Men's junior road race of the 2015 UCI Road World Championships took place in and around Richmond, Virginia, United States on September 26, 2015. The course of the race was eight laps over a  circuit making  with the start and finish in Richmond.

Austria's Felix Gall attacked with  remaining and managed to stay clear at the head of the race to win the gold medal, holding off a fast-finishing Clément Bétouigt-Suire of France, in a two-up sprint finish. One second behind, Danish rider Rasmus Pedersen completed the podium with the bronze medal.

Qualification

Qualification was based mainly on the final UCI Juniors Nations' Cup ranking as of August 15, 2015. The first ten nations in this classification qualified six riders to start, the next five nations qualified five riders to start and the next five nations qualified four riders to start. The United States, as the organising nation, were entitled five riders to start. Other nations and non ranked nations had the opportunity to send three riders to start. Moreover continental champions were qualified to take part in the race, on top of the nation numbers. The outgoing World Champion, Mathieu van der Poel, did not compete as he was no longer eligible to contest junior races.

Course

The junior men rode eight laps on the road race circuit. All road races took place on a challenging, technical and inner-city road circuit. The circuit headed west from Downtown Richmond, working its way onto Monument Avenue, a paver-lined, historic boulevard that's been named one of the "10 Great Streets in America". Cyclists took a 180-degree turn at the Jefferson Davis monument and then maneuvered through the Uptown district and Virginia Commonwealth University. Halfway through the circuit, the race headed down into Shockoe Bottom before following the canal and passing Great Shiplock Park, the start of the Virginia Capital Trail. A sharp, off-camber turn at Rocketts Landing brought the riders to the narrow, twisty, cobbled  climb up to Libby Hill Park in the historic Church Hill neighborhood. A quick descent, followed by three hard turns led to a  climb up 23rd Street. Once atop this steep cobbled hill, riders descended into Shockoe Bottom. This led them to the final  climb on Governor Street. At the top, the riders had to take a sharp left turn onto the false-flat finishing straight,  to the finish.

Schedule
All times are in Eastern Daylight Time (UTC-4).

Participating nations
165 cyclists from 51 nations took part in the men's junior road race. The number of cyclists per nation is shown in parentheses.

Prize money
The UCI assigned premiums for the top 3 finishers with a total prize money of €3,450.

Final classification

References

Men's junior road race
UCI Road World Championships – Men's junior road race
2015 in men's road cycling